From Six to Ten is a Greek morning show which airs on N1 on 5 May 2014 every Monday to Friday at 6am to 10am. It is presented by Stavroula Christofilea and Giannis Skalkos.

New Hellenic Radio, Internet and Television original programming
Greek television news shows
2014 Greek television series debuts
2015 Greek television series endings
2010s Greek television series
Greek-language television shows